The Stone Cottage is a 2006 Country-French inspired home near Cumberland, Maryland, designed and built by Kelly L. Moran.

Built using white limestone, a traditional material commonly found in France and not native to the Eastern United States, a slate roof and post-and-beam construction gives this home the appearance of an old medieval structure when in fact it was completed in 2006. The exterior of the Stone Cottage uses a technique called "Slush & Brush" that was employed thousands of years ago, using a wood paddle instead of a trowel and not raking back the joints. The Stone Cottage is only  and features an open plan Great Room where the kitchen, dining area and living room are located. The open plan design allows for a family to experience 'connected space' instead of being in separate rooms in a home

Moran is an advocate of smaller "cozy house" design. Quoted in the Washington Post AT HOME Magazine, Moran talks of smaller homes being a current trend in the US residential building market.

The Stone Cottage has been featured in several magazines. It is a private residence.

References

External links 
Tuscan Limestone – KGO Stone LLC
Kelly Moran: Traditional, Old World Designer (YouTube)

Buildings and structures in Cumberland, Maryland
Houses in Allegany County, Maryland
History of Cumberland, MD-WV MSA
Houses completed in 2006
2006 establishments in Maryland